Acantholimon acmostegium is a species of Plumbaginaceae that occurs in Iran. The species was described by Pierre Edmond Boissier and Friedrich Alexander Buhse in 1860.

Reference 

acmostegium
Flora of Iran
Taxa named by Pierre Edmond Boissier
Taxa named by Friedrich Alexander Buhse
Plants described in 1860